Housemates is an Australian reality television documentary series on ABC2. The series is produced by Mashup Pictures and features young Australians who combat housing affordability by living in share-houses, introducing audiences to unique living arrangements. It is directed and produced by Rob Innes.

The first season of Housemates became the fourth-most viewed factual documentary program on iview in 2016, so a second season was commissioned by Mashup Pictures which began screening in 2017.

Series 1
 Crunchy Town
 Private House
 App House 
 Animal House

Series 2
 Stripper House
 Almost Vegan House
 Jesus House
 Anarchist House

References

External links
 Housemates - Official Website

English-language television shows
Australian Broadcasting Corporation original programming
2010s Australian documentary television series
2010s Australian reality television series
2016 Australian television series debuts